Paraphyllalia is a monotypic moth genus in the family Eupterotidae described by Max Gaede in 1927. Its single species, Paraphyllalia degenera, was described Its Francis Walker in 1855 and is found in South Africa.

References

Endemic moths of South Africa
Moths described in 1855
Eupterotinae